Alyona Viktorovna Sidko (born 20 September 1979, Krasnoyarsk) is a Russian cross-country skier who competed between 2000 and 2013.

Sidko won a bronze medal in the Individual Sprint at the 2006 Winter Olympics in Turin. She also won a bronze in the Team sprint (with Yuliya Chepalova) at the 2005 FIS Nordic World Ski Championships in Oberstdorf and had her best individual finish of 12th in the Individual sprint in 2003. Sidko has nineteen wins at various levels in distances in up to 10 km since 2002. She took the 2007–08 season off due to pregnancy but returned for the 2008–09 season.

Sidko was banned from competing at the 2010 Vancouver Olympics for breaking anti-doping rules. She had tested positive for EPO at a race in Krasnogorsk 26 December 2009 and was subsequently banned from competing in the sport for two years.

Cross-country skiing results
All results are sourced from the International Ski Federation (FIS).

Olympic Games
 1 medal – (1 bronze)

World Championships
 1 medal – (1 bronze)

World Cup

Season standings

Individual podiums
1 victory 
2 podiums

Team podiums

 6 podiums – (3 , 3 )

References

 FIS Newsflash 177 on Sidko's return from pregnancy. April 30, 2008.

External links
 

Russian female cross-country skiers
1979 births
Living people
Doping cases in cross-country skiing
Russian sportspeople in doping cases
Cross-country skiers at the 2006 Winter Olympics
Olympic bronze medalists for Russia
Olympic cross-country skiers of Russia
Sportspeople from Krasnoyarsk
Olympic medalists in cross-country skiing
FIS Nordic World Ski Championships medalists in cross-country skiing
Medalists at the 2006 Winter Olympics